Lokugamage Rupasena Karunathilake (15 March 1933 – 11 October 2011) (known as Rupa Karunathilake)  was a cabinet minister and Member of Parliament representing Bentara-Elpitiya electorate, in Galle District. He was also a Sri Lanka Ambassador to the Netherlands. He was educated at Ananda Vidyalaya, Elpitiya, Mahinda College, Galle and Nalanda College Colombo. His youngest son Sanjeev now Southern Provincial Council Member.

See also
Sri Lankan Non Career Diplomats
List of political families in Sri Lanka

References

1933 births
2011 deaths
Sri Lankan Buddhists
Alumni of Mahinda College
Alumni of Nalanda College, Colombo
United National Party politicians
Members of the 9th Parliament of Sri Lanka
Members of the 10th Parliament of Sri Lanka
Ambassadors of Sri Lanka to the Netherlands
Ministers of state of Sri Lanka
District ministers of Sri Lanka
Shipping ministers of Sri Lanka
Sinhalese politicians